Galolhu is a district of Malé, Maldives.

Location within Malé City 
Galolhu is in the central and southern portions of Malé Island:

References

See also 
 Galolhu Rasmee Dhandu Stadium
 

Populated places in the Maldives